Margarita del Val Latorre (born 1959) is a Spanish chemist, immunologist, and virologist. She coordinates the Salud Global ("Global Health") platform run by the Spanish National Research Council (CSIC).

Early life and education
Margarita del Val was born in Madrid in 1959 to the chemists Manuel del Val and Consuelo Latorre. del Val attended the Autonomous University of Madrid (UAM) starting in 1976, during the Transition. During this time, increasing protests on university grounds against the Francoist dictatorship culminated in all Spanish universities going on strike starting in 1973, which was ongoing when she arrived at the university. In the absence of any classes, del Val and other students read books and played games.

Career
After completing her doctorate in 1986, she left for West Germany, spending two years at the Federal Research Centre for Virus Diseases of Animals in Tübingen, a now-defunct research institution of the Friedrich Loeffler Institute. She then spent three years at the University of Ulm. del Val returned to Spain in the 1990s, having developed an experimental vaccine design based on isolated T-cell epitopes. Afterwards, del Val stayed abroad at the National Institutes of Health in Bethesda, Maryland and McGill University in Montreal, before spending twenty years at the Carlos III Health Institute.

In April 2020, del Val helped set up and launch the Salud Global ("Global Health") program, a CSIC project facilitating COVID-19 research between over 300 Spanish research groups. del Val has provided her thoughts on Spain's experience with the COVID-19 pandemic and requested an investigation into Spain's handling of the pandemic.

Selected publications

Awards and honors 
In 2015 del Val was named a corresponding academician of the Royal Academy of Pharmacy. In 2021 she received the "Medalla de Honor a los Valores Sociales" from Menéndez Pelayo International University for her work in Spain during the COVID-19 pandemic.

Personal life
del Val is married to the biologist Enrique J. de la Rosa, who she met at the UAM in 1977. She has a son and daughter.

References

Living people
Spanish scientists
Women biochemists
Immunologists
Autonomous University of Madrid alumni
1959 births